Árpád Fekete (5 March 1921 – 26 February 2012) was a Hungarian football player and manager.

Career
Born in Salgótarján, Fekete played as a centre forward in Hungary, Romania and Italy for Újpest, Carmen București, Como, Pro Sesto, SPAL, Cosenza, Messina and Cagliari.

He later became a football coach in Mexico, managing Guadalajara and the Mexico national team among others. Fekete managed four clubs from Guadalajara, Chivas, C.D. Oro, Club Atlas and Tecos, and won Liga MX titles with Chivas and Oro.

Honours

Player
Újpest
Nemzeti Bajnokság I (2): 1938–39, 1945
Mitropa Cup (1): 1939

Manager
Guadalajara
Mexican Primera División (2): 1958–59, 1959–60
Campeón de Campeones (2): 1959, 1960
C.D. Oro
Mexican Primera División (1): 1962–63
Campeón de Campeones (1): 1963
Pumas UNAM
Copa México (1): 1974–75

References

External links

1921 births
2012 deaths
People from Salgótarján
Association football forwards
Hungarian footballers
Nemzeti Bajnokság I players
Liga I players
Serie B players
Újpest FC players
FC Carmen București players
Como 1907 players
S.S.D. Pro Sesto players
S.P.A.L. players
Cosenza Calcio 1914 players
A.C.R. Messina players
Cagliari Calcio players
Hungarian football managers
Expatriate footballers in Romania
Expatriate footballers in Italy
Mexico national football team managers
Club Universidad Nacional managers
Tigres UANL managers
Atlante F.C. managers
Club León managers
Atlético Morelia managers
Deportivo Toluca F.C. managers
C.D. Guadalajara managers
Atlas F.C. managers
Tecos F.C. managers
Expatriate football managers in Mexico
Hungarian expatriate sportspeople in Romania
Hungarian expatriate sportspeople in Italy
Hungarian expatriate sportspeople in Mexico
Sportspeople from Nógrád County